The lac La Chesnaye is a freshwater body of the watershed of the rivière aux Anglais, located in the territory of the town of Baie-Comeau, in the Manicouagan Regional County Municipality, in the administrative region of Côte-Nord, in the province of Quebec, in Canada.

The eastern side of Lac La Chesnaye is served by a few forest roads connecting from the south to route 138. The west side does not have roads suitable for motor vehicles due to the mountainous terrain.

Forestry is the main economic activity around the lake.

Geography 
Lac La Chesnaye is located in the eastern part of the town of Baie-Comeau. This deformed lake surrounded by mountains is crossed to the east, then to the north, by the rivière aux Anglais. It has six islands. This lake has a dam erected at its mouth. The northern part has five bays, three of which stretch north, including the  bay leading to the mouth. The southern part has three large bays at the foot of high cliffs.

From the mouth of Lac La Chesnaye, the current descends on  generally towards the south-east, following the course of the Rivière aux Anglais, in particular crossing the lake Unknown and the lac de la Rivière aux Anglais, to go to spill on the west shore of Baie aux Anglais, on the north shore of the estuary of Saint Lawrence.

Toponym 
The toponym "Lac La Chesnaye" evokes the memory of Charles Aubert de La Chesnaye, a merchant and fur trader, financier and main businessman in New France in the 17th century. The term "Chesnaye" is a graphic form of old French; it means "Chênaie" (or Chesnaie), or a field planted with oaks 

The toponym "Lac La Chesnaye" was formalized on December 5, 1968, at the Place Names Bank of the Commission de toponymie du Québec.

See also 
 Manicouagan Regional County Municipality
 Baie-Comeau, a city
 Rivière aux Anglais, a stream
 Rivière des Trois des Pointes, a stream
 Gulf of St. Lawrence, a stream
 List of rivers of Quebec

References

Bibliography 

 .

Lakes of Côte-Nord
Manicouagan Regional County Municipality